Qeshlaq-e Hajji Samid (also Romanized as Qeshlāq-e Ḩājjī Şamīd) is a village in Angut-e Gharbi Rural District, Anguti District, Germi County, Ardabil Province, Iran. At the 2006 census, its population was 55, in 11 families.

References 

Towns and villages in Germi County